The 1983–84 Boston Celtics were champions of the National Basketball Association (NBA) for the 15th time in franchise history, led by regular season and finals MVP Larry Bird.

In the playoffs, the Celtics defeated the Washington Bullets in the First Round in three games, defeated the New York Knicks in the Semi-finals in seven games, and defeated the Milwaukee Bucks in the Conference Finals in five games, advancing to the NBA Finals. In the Finals, the Celtics faced their long time rival, the Los Angeles Lakers, the first time the two teams faced off against each other since 1969 in which the Celtics won 4–3, and the first time the two teams met in the Finals in the 1980s. The Celtics would go on to defeat the Lakers in seven games, winning their fifteenth NBA championship, and extending their NBA Finals victories over the Lakers to 8.

Offseason

NBA Draft

Roster

Regular season

Season standings

z – clinched division title
y – clinched division title
x – clinched playoff spot

Record vs. opponents

Game log

Regular season

|-
|- align="center" bgcolor="#ffcccc"
| 1
| October 28, 19837:35 pm EDT
| @ Detroit
| L 121–127
| McHale (25)
| McHale (10)
| Henderson (6)
| Pontiac Silverdome17,117
| 0–1
|- align="center" bgcolor="#ccffcc"
| 2
| October 29, 19838:05 pm EDT
| @ Cleveland
| W 108–89
| McHale (22)
| Bird (13)
| Bird (7)
| Richfield Coliseum8,194
| 1–1
|-

|-
|- align="center" bgcolor="#ccffcc"
| 3
| November 2, 1983
| Milwaukee
| W 119–105
|
|
|
| Boston Garden
| 2–1
|- align="center" bgcolor="#ccffcc"
| 4
| November 4, 1983
| Indiana
| W 121–105
|
|
|
| Boston Garden
| 3–1
|- align="center" bgcolor="#ccffcc
| 5
| November 5, 1983
| @ Washington
| W 120–117
|
|
|
| Capital Centre
| 4–1
|- align="center" bgcolor="#ccffcc"
| 6
| November 8, 1983
| @ Indiana
| W 99–97
|
|
|
| Market Square Arena
| 5–1
|- align="center" bgcolor="#ccffcc"
| 7
| November 9, 1983
| San Diego
| W 129–122
|
|
|
| Boston Garden
| 6–1
|- align="center" bgcolor="#ccffcc"
| 8
| November 11, 19837:30 pm EST
| Detroit
| W 126–118
| Bird (39)
| McHale,Parish (12)
| Maxwell (8)
| Boston Garden14,890
| 7–1
|- align="center" bgcolor="#ccffcc"
| 9
| November 12, 1983
| @ Chicago
| W 116–101
|
|
|
| Chicago Stadium
| 8–1
|- align="center" bgcolor="#ccffcc"
| 10
| November 15, 1983
| @ Denver
| W 140–124
|
|
|
| McNichols Sports Arena
| 9–1
|- align="center" bgcolor="#ffcccc"
| 11
| November 16, 1983
| @ Utah
| L 109–122
|
|
|
| Salt Palace
| 9–2
|- align="center" bgcolor="#ffcccc"
| 12
| November 18, 1983
| New York
| L 103–110
|
|
|
| Boston Garden
| 9–3
|- align="center" bgcolor="#ffcccc"
| 13
| November 19, 1983
| @ Philadelphia
| L 91–92
|
|
|
| The Spectrum
| 9–4
|- align="center" bgcolor="#ffcccc"
| 14
| November 22, 1983
| @ New York
| L 113–117 (2OT)
|
|
|
| Madison Square Garden
| 9–5
|- align="center" bgcolor="#ccffcc"
| 15
| November 25, 1983
| Atlanta
| W 109–102
|
|
|
| Boston Garden
| 10–5
|- align="center" bgcolor="#ccffcc"
| 16
| November 27, 19837:30 pm EST
| Detroit
| W 114–99
| McHale (29)
| Parish (13)
| Bird (8)
| Boston Garden14,890
| 11–5
|- align="center" bgcolor="#ccffcc"
| 17
| November 30, 1983
| San Antonio
| W 130–106
|
|
|
| Boston Garden
| 12–5
|-

|-
|- align="center" bgcolor="#ccffcc"
| 18
| December 2, 1983
| Portland
| W 115–106
|
|
|
| Boston Garden
| 12–6
|- align="center" bgcolor="#ffcccc"
| 19
| December 4, 1983
| Philadelphia
| L 114–121 (OT)
|
|
|
| Boston Garden
| 13–6
|- align="center" bgcolor="#ccffcc"
| 20
| December 6, 1983
| @ Chicago
| W 118–105
|
|
|
| Chicago Stadium
| 14–6
|- align="center" bgcolor="#ccffcc"
| 21
| December 7, 1983
| @ Indiana
| W 100–95
|
|
|
| Market Square Arena
| 15–6
|- align="center" bgcolor="#ccffcc"
| 22
| December 9, 1983
| Denver
| W 119–90
|
|
|
| Boston Garden
| 16–6
|- align="center" bgcolor="#ccffcc"
| 23
| December 10, 1983
| @ Atlanta
| W 104–87
|
|
|
| The Omni
| 17–6
|- align="center" bgcolor="#ccffcc"
| 24
| December 13, 1983
| @ New York
| W 102–100
|
|
|
| Madison Square Garden
| 18–6
|- align="center" bgcolor="#ccffcc"
| 25
| December 14, 19837:30 pm EST
| Cleveland
| W 110–108
| Parish (30)
| Parish (16)
| Henderson (6)
| Boston Garden14,890
| 19–6
|- align="center" bgcolor="#ffcccc"
| 26
| December 16, 1983
| Washington
| L 93–100
|
|
|
| Boston Garden
| 19–7
|- align="center" bgcolor="#ccffcc"
| 27
| December 17, 19837:35 pm EST
| @ Detroit
| W 129–115
| McHale (30)
| McHale (16)
| Bird (9)
| Pontiac Silverdome<be>24,318
| 20–7
|- align="center" bgcolor="#ccffcc"
| 28
| December 21, 1983
| Atlanta
| W 107–96
|
|
|
| Boston Garden
| 21–7
|- align="center" bgcolor="#ccffcc"
| 29
| December 23, 1983
| New Jersey
| W 125–113
|
|
|
| Boston Garden
| 22–7
|- align="center" bgcolor="#ccffcc"
| 30
| December 27, 1983
| @ San Antonio
| W 115–100
|
|
|
| HemisFair Arena
| 23–7
|- align="center" bgcolor="#ffcccc"
| 31
| December 29, 1983
| @ Houston
| L 94–107
|
|
|
| The Summit
| 23–8
|- align="center" bgcolor="#ccffcc"
| 32
| December 30, 1983
| @ Dallas
| W 114–109 (OT)
|
|
|
| Reunion Arena
| 24–8
|-

|-
|- align="center" bgcolor="#ccffcc"
| 33
| January 3, 1984
| @ New Jersey
| W 105–103
|
|
|
| Brendan Byrne Arena
| 25–8
|- align="center" bgcolor="#ccffcc"
| 34
| January 4, 1984
| Washington
| W 113–104
|
|
|
| Boston Garden
| 26–8
|- align="center" bgcolor="#ccffcc"
| 35
| January 6, 19847:30 pm EST
| Cleveland
| W 115–97
| Bird (19)
| Bird (7)
| Henderson (8)
| Boston Garden14,890
| 27–8
|- align="center" bgcolor="#ccffcc"
| 36
| January 11, 1984
| Golden State
| W 135–112
|
|
|
| Boston Garden
| 28–8
|- align="center" bgcolor="#ccffcc"
| 37
| January 13, 1984
| @ Philadelphia
| W 105–104
|
|
|
| The Spectrum
| 29–8
|- align="center" bgcolor="#ffcccc"
| 38
| January 15, 1984
| @ Milwaukee
| L 87–106
|
|
|
| MECCA Arena
| 29–9
|- align="center" bgcolor="#ccffcc"
| 39
| January 17, 1984
| @ Kansas City
| W 122–113
|
|
|
| Kemper Arena
| 30–9
|- align="center" bgcolor="#ccffcc"
| 40
| January 20, 1984
| Indiana
| W 132–125
|
|
|
| Boston Garden
| 31–9
|- align="center" bgcolor="#ccffcc"
| 41
| January 22, 1984
| Milwaukee
| W 109–98
|
|
|
| Boston Garden
| 32–9
|- align="center" bgcolor="#ccffcc"
| 42
| January 24, 19847:35 pm EST
| @ Cleveland
| W 118–97
| Bird (24)
| Parish (9)
| Ainge (5)
| Richfield Coliseum5,830
| 33–9
|- align="center" bgcolor="#ccffcc"
| 43
| January 25, 1984
| Philadelphia
| W 102–98
|
|
|
| Boston Garden
| 34–9
|- align="center" bgcolor="#ccffcc"
| 44
| January 31, 1984
| @ Chicago
| W 106–83
|
|
|
| Chicago Stadium
| 35–9
|-

|-
|- align="center" bgcolor="#ccffcc"
| 45
| February 1, 1984
| Kansas City
| W 119–110
|
|
|
| Boston Garden
| 36–9
|- align="center" bgcolor="#ccffcc"
| 46
| February 3, 1984
| Indiana
| W 125–106
|
|
|
| Boston Garden
| 37–9
|- align="center" bgcolor="#ccffcc"
| 47
| February 5, 19841:00 pm EST
| Detroit
| W 137–134 (OT)
| McHale (33)
| Bird (19)
| Ainge (7)
| Boston Garden14,890
| 38–9
|- align="center" bgcolor="#ffcccc"
| 48
| February 6, 1984
| @ New Jersey
| L 112–115
|
|
|
| Brendan Byrne Arena
| 38–10
|- align="center" bgcolor="#ffcccc"
| 49
| February 8, 1984
| Los Angeles
| L 109–111
|
|
|
| Boston Garden
| 38–11
|- align="center" bgcolor="#ccffcc"
| 50
| February 10, 1984
| Houston
| W 114–101
|
|
|
| Boston Garden
| 39–11
|- align="center" bgcolor="#ffcccc"
| 51
| February 12, 1984
| Philadelphia
| L 91–109
|
|
|
| Boston Garden
| 39–12
|- align="center" bgcolor="#ccffcc"
| 52
| February 16, 1984
| @ Golden State
| W 125–115
|
|
|
| Oakland-Alameda County Coliseum Arena
| 40–12
|- align="center" bgcolor="#ccffcc"
| 53
| February 17, 1984
| @ Seattle
| W 111–100
|
|
|
| Kingdome
| 41–12
|- align="center" bgcolor="#ccffcc"
| 54
| February 19, 1984
| @ Portland
| W 107–101
|
|
|
| Memorial Coliseum
| 42–12
|- align="center" bgcolor="#ffcccc"
| 55
| February 22, 1984
| @ San Diego
| L 107–114
|
|
|
| San Diego Sports Arena
| 42–13
|- align="center" bgcolor="#ffcccc"
| 56
| February 24, 1984
| @ Los Angeles
| L 108–116
|
|
|
| The Forum
| 42–14
|- align="center" bgcolor="#ccffcc"
| 57
| February 26, 1984
| @ Phoenix
| W 116–109
|
|
|
| Arizona Veterans Memorial Coliseum
| 43–14
|- align="center" bgcolor="#ffcccc"
| 58
| February 29, 1984
| New York
| L 98–102
|
|
|
| Boston Garden
| 43–15
|-

|-
|- align="center" bgcolor="#ccffcc"
| 59
| March 2, 1984
| Chicago
| W 104–100
|
|
|
| Boston Garden
| 44–15
|- align="center" bgcolor="#ccffcc"
| 60
| March 4, 1984
| Seattle
| W 117–93
|
|
|
| Boston Garden
| 45–15
|- align="center" bgcolor="#ccffcc
| 61
| March 6, 1984
| @ Washington
| W 108–86
|
|
|
| Capital Centre
| 46–15
|- align="center" bgcolor="#ccffcc"
| 62
| March 7, 1984
| Utah
| W 117–106
|
|
|
| Boston Garden
| 47–15
|- align="center" bgcolor="#ccffcc"
| 63
| March 9, 1984
| @ Milwaukee
| W 129–128 (2OT)
|
|
|
| MECCA Arena
| 48–15
|- align="center" bgcolor="#ccffcc"
| 64
| March 11, 1984
| Phoenix
| W 117–109
|
|
|
| Boston Garden
| 49–15
|- align="center" bgcolor="#ffcccc"
| 65
| March 14, 1984
| Washington
| L 99–103
|
|
|
| Boston Garden
| 49–16
|- align="center" bgcolor="#ccffcc"
| 66
| March 16, 1984
| Milwaukee
| W 109–99
|
|
|
| Boston Garden
| 50–16
|- align="center" bgcolor="#ccffcc"
| 67
| March 17, 1984
| @ Atlanta
| W 103–88
|
|
|
| The Omni
| 51–16
|- align="center" bgcolor="#ffcccc"
| 68
| March 20, 1984
| @ Indiana
| L 121–123 (OT)
|
|
|
| Market Square Arena
| 51–17
|- align="center" bgcolor="#ccffcc"
| 69
| March 22, 1984
| @ New York
| W 108–100
|
|
|
| Madison Square Garden
| 52–17
|- align="center" bgcolor="#ffcccc"
| 70
| March 23, 1984
| New Jersey
| L 97–101
|
|
|
| Boston Garden
| 52–18
|- align="center" bgcolor="#ffcccc"
| 71
| March 25, 1984
| @ Philadelphia
| L 114–119 (2OT)
|
|
|
| The Spectrum
| 52–19
|- align="center" bgcolor="#ccffcc
| 72
| March 27, 1984
| @ Washington
| W 106–93
|
|
|
| Capital Centre
| 53–19
|- align="center" bgcolor="#ccffcc"
| 73
| March 28, 1984
| Dallas
| W 114–107
|
|
|
| Boston Garden
| 54–19
|- align="center" bgcolor="#ccffcc"
| 74
| March 30, 1984
| Atlanta
| W 105–96
|
|
|
| Boston Garden
| 55–19
|- align="center" bgcolor="#ccffcc"
| 75
| March 31, 1984
| @ New Jersey
| W 107–98
|
|
|
| Brendan Byrne Arena
| 56–19
|-

|-
|- align="center" bgcolor="#ccffcc"
| 76
| April 3, 19847:35 pm EST
| @ Cleveland
| W 98–86
| Bird (29)
| Parish (15)
| Bird (6)
| Richfield Coliseum7,094
| 57–19
|- align="center" bgcolor="#ccffcc"
| 77
| April 6, 19847:30 pm EST
| Cleveland
| W 113–94
| Bird (33)
| Parish (14)
| Buckner (11)
| Boston Garden14,890
| 58–19
|- align="center" bgcolor="#ccffcc"
| 78
| April 8, 1984
| Chicago
| W 117–110
|
|
|
| Boston Garden
| 59–19
|- align="center" bgcolor="#ccffcc"
| 79
| April 10, 1984
| @ Milwaukee
| W 96–95
|
|
|
| MECCA Arena
| 60–19
|- align="center" bgcolor="#ccffcc"
| 80
| April 11, 1984
| New York
| W 102–96
|
|
|
| Boston Garden
| 61–19
|- align="center" bgcolor="#ffcccc"
| 81
| April 13, 19847:35 pm EST
| @ Detroit
| L 120–128 (OT)
| McHale (32)
| Bird (20)
| Johnson (8)
| Pontiac Silverdome30,091
| 61–20
|- align="center" bgcolor="#ccffcc"
| 82
| April 15, 1984
| New Jersey
| W 118–111
|
|
|
| Boston Garden
| 62–20
|-

|-
| 1984 regular season schedule

Playoffs

|- align="center" bgcolor="#ccffcc"
| 1
| April 17
| Washington
| W 91–83
| Larry Bird (23)
| Robert Parish (14)
| Larry Bird (12)
| Boston Garden14,890
| 1–0
|- align="center" bgcolor="#ccffcc"
| 2
| April 19
| Washington
| W 88–85
| Larry Bird (23)
| Larry Bird (12)
| Larry Bird (6)
| Boston Garden14,890
| 2–0
|- align="center" bgcolor="#ffcccc"
| 3
| April 21
| @ Washington
| L 108–111 (OT)
| Larry Bird (27)
| Robert Parish (16)
| Bird, Johnson (6)
| Capital Centre8,359
| 2–1
|- align="center" bgcolor="#ccffcc"
| 4
| April 24
| @ Washington
| W 99–96
| Robert Parish (20)
| Robert Parish (12)
| Larry Bird (7)
| Capital Centre13,853
| 3–1
|-

|- align="center" bgcolor="#ccffcc"
| 1
| April 29
| New York
| W 110–92
| Kevin McHale (25)
| Robert Parish (12)
| Larry Bird (12)
| Boston Garden14,890
| 1–0
|- align="center" bgcolor="#ccffcc"
| 2
| May 2
| New York
| W 116–102
| Larry Bird (37)
| Bird, Parish (11)
| Dennis Johnson (7)
| Boston Garden14,890
| 2–0
|- align="center" bgcolor="#ffcccc"
| 3
| May 4
| @ New York
| L 92–100
| Larry Bird (24)
| Larry Bird (11)
| Dennis Johnson (4)
| Madison Square Garden19,591
| 2–1
|- align="center" bgcolor="#ffcccc"
| 4
| May 6
| @ New York
| L 113–118
| Larry Bird (29)
| Larry Bird (11)
| Dennis Johnson (7)
| Madison Square Garden15,840
| 2–2
|- align="center" bgcolor="#ccffcc"
| 5
| May 9
| New York
| W 121–99
| Larry Bird (26)
| Robert Parish (10)
| Larry Bird (10)
| Boston Garden14,890
| 3–2
|- align="center" bgcolor="#ffcccc"
| 6
| May 11
| @ New York
| L 104–106
| Larry Bird (35)
| Larry Bird (11)
| Gerald Henderson (8)
| Madison Square Garden19,591
| 3–3
|- align="center" bgcolor="#ccffcc"
| 7
| May 13
| New York
| W 121–104
| Larry Bird (39)
| Larry Bird (12)
| Larry Bird (10)
| Boston Garden14,890
| 4–3
|-

|- align="center" bgcolor="#ccffcc"
| 1
| May 15
| Milwaukee
| W 119–96
| Larry Bird (24)
| Kevin McHale (7)
| Gerald Henderson (7)
| Boston Garden14,890
| 1–0
|- align="center" bgcolor="#ccffcc"
| 2
| May 17
| Milwaukee
| W 125–110
| Larry Bird (32)
| Larry Bird (13)
| Larry Bird (7)
| Boston Garden14,890
| 2–0
|- align="center" bgcolor="#ccffcc"
| 3
| May 19
| @ Milwaukee
| W 109–100
| Larry Bird (28)
| Robert Parish (16)
| Larry Bird (6)
| MECCA Arena11,052
| 3–0
|- align="center" bgcolor="#ffcccc"
| 4
| May 21
| @ Milwaukee
| L 113–122
| Larry Bird (32)
| Larry Bird (10)
| Larry Bird (8)
| MECCA Arena11,052
| 3–1
|- align="center" bgcolor="#ccffcc"
| 5
| May 23
| Milwaukee
| W 115–108
| Larry Bird (21)
| Larry Bird (13)
| Bird, Maxwell (4)
| Boston Garden14,890
| 4–1
|-

|- align="center" bgcolor="#ffcccc"
| 1
| May 27
| Los Angeles
| L 109–115
| Kevin McHale (25)
| Larry Bird (14)
| Larry Bird (5)
| Boston Garden14,890
| 0–1
|- align="center" bgcolor="#ccffcc"
| 2
| May 31
| Los Angeles
| W 124–121 (OT)
| Larry Bird (27)
| Larry Bird (13)
| Ainge, Henderson (5)
| Boston Garden14,890
| 1–1
|- align="center" bgcolor="#ffcccc"
| 3
| June 3
| @ Los Angeles
| L 104–137
| Larry Bird (30)
| Robert Parish (12)
| Cedric Maxwell (5)
| The Forum17,505
| 1–2
|- align="center" bgcolor="#ccffcc"
| 4
| June 6
| @ Los Angeles
| W 129–125 (OT)
| Larry Bird (29)
| Larry Bird (21)
| Dennis Johnson (14)
| The Forum17,505
| 2–2
|- align="center" bgcolor="#ccffcc"
| 5
| June 8
| Los Angeles
| W 121–103
| Larry Bird (34)
| Larry Bird (17)
| Gerald Henderson (9)
| Boston Garden14,890
| 3–2
|- align="center" bgcolor="#ffcccc"
| 6
| June 10
| @ Los Angeles
| L 108–119
| Larry Bird (28)
| Larry Bird (14)
| Larry Bird (8)
| The Forum17,505
| 3–3
|- align="center" bgcolor="#ccffcc"
| 7
| June 12
| Los Angeles
| W 111–102
| Cedric Maxwell (24)
| Robert Parish (16)
| Cedric Maxwell (8)
| Boston Garden14,890
| 4–3
|-

Player stats
Note: GP= Games played; REB= Rebounds; AST= Assists; STL = Steals; BLK = Blocks; PTS = Points; AVG = Scoring Average

NBA Finals

Game One 
The Lakers opened the series with a 115-109 victory at Boston Garden.

Game Two 
In Game 2, the Lakers led 113-111 with 18 seconds left when Gerald Henderson stole a James Worthy pass to score a game tying layup and the Celtics eventually prevailed in overtime 124-121.

Game Three 
In Game 3, the Lakers raced to an easy 137-104 victory as Magic Johnson dished out 21 assists. After the game, Larry Bird said his team played like "sissies" in an attempt to light a fire under his teammates.

Game Four 
In Game 4, the Lakers had a five-point lead with less than a minute to play, but made several execution errors as the Celtics tied the game and then came away with a 129-125 victory in overtime. The game was also marked by Celtic forward Kevin McHale's takedown of Laker forward Kurt Rambis on a breakaway layup which triggered the physical aspect of the rivalry.  Kareem Abdul-Jabbar would go after Larry Bird later on in the third quarter, and 1981 Finals MVP Cedric Maxwell further antagonized the Lakers by following a missed James Worthy free throw by crossing the lane with his hands around his own neck, symbolizing that Worthy was "choking" under pressure. Also, Bird pushed Michael Cooper to the baseline following the inbound play during the second quarter.

Game Five 
In Game 5, the Celtics took a 3-2 series lead as Larry Bird scored 34 points. The game was known as the "Heat Game", as it was played under 97-degree heat, and without any air conditioning, at Boston Garden. The Celtics did not warm up with their sweat pants on because of extreme heat, and oxygen tanks were provided to give air to exhausted players.

Game Six 
In Game 6, the Lakers evened the series with a 119-108 victory. In the game the Lakers answered the Celtics' rough tactics when Laker forward James Worthy shoved Cedric Maxwell into a basket support. After the game a Laker fan threw a beer at Celtics guard M.L. Carr as he left the floor, causing him to label the series "all-out-war."

Game Seven 
In Game 7, the heat that was an issue in Game 5 was not so bad (indoor temperatures hovered around 91 degrees during the game, due to additional fans being brought in to try to cool the air).  The Celtics were led by Cedric Maxwell who had 24 points, eight rebounds and eight assists as they came away with a 111-102 victory. In the game the Lakers rallied from a 14-point-deficit to three with one minute remaining when Cedric Maxwell knocked the ball away from Magic Johnson. Dennis Johnson responded by sinking two free throws to seal the victory. Larry Bird was named MVP of the series.

The series was the eighth time in NBA history that the Celtics and Lakers met in the NBA finals, with Boston winning each time.

Award winners
 Larry Bird, NBA Free Throw Percentage Leader (88.8%)
 Larry Bird, NBA Most Valuable Player
 Larry Bird, NBA Finals Most Valuable Player
 Larry Bird, All-NBA First Team
 Kevin McHale, Sixth Man of the Year Award

References

 Celtics on Database Basketball
 Celtics on Basketball Reference

Boston Celtics seasons
Eastern Conference (NBA) championship seasons
NBA championship seasons
Boston Celtics
Boston Celtics
Boston Celtics
Celtics
Celtics